The Laurence Olivier Award for Best Lighting Design is an annual award presented by the Society of London Theatre in recognition of achievements in commercial London theatre. The awards were established as the Society of West End Theatre Awards in 1976, and renamed in 1984 in honour of English actor and director Laurence Olivier.

This award was introduced in 1991. There had been an award for Designer of the Year from 1976 to 1990, originally focused on set designers but including an increasing number of commingled nominations for other design specialties through the years. The commingled single award was retired after the 1990 ceremony, with more granular awards introduced in 1991 for Best Set Design and Best Costume Design, along with this Best Lighting Design award.

Winners and nominees

1990s

2000s

2010s

2020s

See also
 Tony Award for Best Lighting Design

References

External links
 

Lighting Design